"If I Had You" is a song by American recording artist and American Idol season eight runner-up Adam Lambert. The song was written by Max Martin, Shellback, and Savan Kotecha and produced by Martin, Shellback and Kristian Lundin for Lambert's debut album, For Your Entertainment (2009). It was released as the third and final international single from the album on May 11, 2010. The song reached number 30 in the United States and reached the top ten in Australia, Canada, Finland, Hungary and New Zealand. The song was performed on Lambert's first concert tour, the 2010 Glam Nation Tour where it was the show's finale.

Critical reception
Huffington Post noted that this is one of songs that is a "full-display" of album that "operates from a disco/glam aesthetic of escapism and liberation via dance, dress-up, and desire" and added that it "fully accomplish what the singer had in mind for the album: songs that make you want to let loose, dance, work out, have fun." Detroit News thought that this song was "potential single" when reviewing the album. It was listed, at 57th spot, by Billboard on "Top 100 'American Idol' Hits of All Time" list.

Promotion
Following the release of the single on May 11, 2010, Lambert performed the song on a series of talk-shows, including The Ellen DeGeneres Show on May 19, and The Tonight Show with Jay Leno on May 21.

Music video
The video premiered June 14, 2010 on VH1 and "takes the late-night wilderness party motif of Jennifer Lopez's classic "Waiting for Tonight" clip and adds more lasers, guyliner, thrashy dance moves, silver top hats and outrageously spiky shoulder pads." Two lion dances also appeared in the video as well. Bryan Barber directed the video, which was inspired by Lambert's self-proclaimed "psychedelic" experience at Burning Man.

James Montgomery from MTV describes the video as having   Montgomery states the message of the video is "Humanity can, in fact, put their differences aside and just dance."

Making a cameo in the video are Lambert's friends: Allison Iraheta, Cheeks, Scarlett Cherry, Alisan Porter, Brooke Wendle, Terrence Spencer, Sasha Mallory, Kesha and Cassidy Haley.

Track listing
Australian digital EP
 "If I Had You" (radio mix) – 3:46
 "If I Had You" (Jason Nevins radio mix) – 3:45
 "If I Had You" (instrumental version) – 3:43

Australian CD single
 "If I Had You" – 3:47
 "If I Had You" (instrumental version) – 3:46

US/AUS digital EP The Remixes
 "If I Had You" (radio mix) – 3:47
 "If I Had You" (Jason Nevins extended mix) – 6:44
 "If I Had You" (Jason Nevins Robotronic extended mix) – 6:17
 "If I Had You" (Dangerous Muse remix) – 5:51
 "If I Had You" (Morgan Page extended remix) – 7:53

Personnel
Songwriting – Max Martin, Shellback, Savan Kotecha
Production – Max Martin, Shellback, Kristian Lundin
Keyboards – Max Martin, Shellback
Guitar and bass – Shellback
Recording – Max Martin, Shellback, Brian Warwick
Mixing – Serban Ghenea
Mix engineer – John Hanes
Mixing assistant – Tim Roberts

Source:

Chart performance
As of August 5, 2011, "If I Had You" has sold 835,000 downloads in the United States and charted at number 30 on the Billboard Hot 100. "If I Had You" has reached number-one in Hungary and the top 10 in Canada, New Zealand, Australia, Finland and Poland.

Weekly charts

Year-end charts

Certifications

Release history

References

2010 singles
Adam Lambert songs
Song recordings produced by Max Martin
Songs written by Max Martin
Songs written by Shellback (record producer)
Songs written by Savan Kotecha
Song recordings produced by Shellback (record producer)
Music videos directed by Bryan Barber
2009 songs